In mathematics, specifically in commutative algebra, the elementary symmetric polynomials are one type of basic building block for symmetric polynomials, in the sense that any symmetric polynomial can be expressed as a polynomial in elementary symmetric polynomials.  That is, any symmetric polynomial  is given by an expression involving only additions and multiplication of constants and elementary symmetric polynomials.  There is one elementary symmetric polynomial of degree  in  variables for each positive integer , and it is formed by adding together all distinct products of  distinct variables.

Definition

and so forth, ending with

In general, for  we define
 
so that  if .
(Sometimes,  is included among the elementary symmetric polynomials, but excluding it allows generally simpler formulation of results and properties.)

Thus, for each positive integer  less than or equal to  there exists exactly one elementary symmetric polynomial of degree  in  variables.  To form the one that has degree , we take the sum of all products of -subsets of the  variables.  (By contrast, if one performs the same operation using multisets of variables, that is, taking variables with repetition, one arrives at the complete homogeneous symmetric polynomials.)

Given an integer partition (that is, a finite non-increasing sequence of positive integers) , one defines the symmetric polynomial , also called an elementary symmetric polynomial, by
 .

Examples
The following lists the  elementary symmetric polynomials for the first four positive values of .

For :

For : 

For :

For :

Properties

The elementary symmetric polynomials appear when we expand a linear factorization of a monic polynomial: we have the identity 

These relations between the roots and the coefficients of a polynomial are called Vieta's formulas.

The characteristic polynomial of a square matrix is an example of application of Vieta's formulas. The roots of this polynomial are the eigenvalues of the matrix. When we substitute these eigenvalues into the elementary symmetric polynomials, we obtain – up to their sign – the coefficients of the characteristic polynomial, which are invariants of the matrix. Thus the determinant of a square matrix is the product of the eigenvalues.

The set of elementary symmetric polynomials in  variables generates the ring of symmetric polynomials in  variables.  More specifically, the ring of symmetric polynomials with integer coefficients equals the integral polynomial ring . (See below for a more general statement and proof.) This fact is one of the foundations of invariant theory. For another system of symmetric polynomials with the same property see Complete homogeneous symmetric polynomials, and for a system with a similar, but slightly weaker, property see Power sum symmetric polynomial.

Fundamental theorem of symmetric polynomials 

This means that every symmetric polynomial  has a unique representation

for some polynomial .

Proof sketch 
The theorem may be proved for symmetric homogeneous polynomials by a double induction with respect to the number of variables  and, for fixed , with respect to the degree of the homogeneous polynomial. The general case then follows by splitting an arbitrary symmetric polynomial into its homogeneous components (which are again symmetric). 

In the case  the result is trivial because every polynomial in one variable is automatically symmetric.

Assume now that the theorem has been proved for all polynomials for  variables and all symmetric polynomials in  variables with degree . Every homogeneous symmetric polynomial  in  can be decomposed as a sum of homogeneous symmetric polynomials

Because  is symmetric, the lacunary part is determined by its terms containing only the variables , i.e., which do not contain . (This is because every monomial which can appear in a lacunary part must lack at least one variable, and thus can be transformed by a permutation of the variables into a monomial which contains only the variables .)

By the inductive hypothesis, this polynomial can be written as 

Here the doubly indexed  denote the elementary symmetric polynomials in  variables. 

Consider now the polynomial 

(the first equality holds because setting  to 0 in  gives , for all ). As we know, this shows that the lacunary part of  coincides with that of the original polynomial . Therefore the difference  has no lacunary part, and is therefore divisible by the product  of all variables, which equals the elementary symmetric polynomial .

The uniqueness of the representation can be proved inductively in a similar way. (It is equivalent to the fact that the  polynomials  are algebraically independent over the ring .)

Alternative proof 

Assume the symmetric polynomial to be homogeneous of degree ; different homogeneous components can be decomposed separately. Order the individual elementary symmetric polynomials  in the product so that those with larger indices  come first, then build for each such factor a column of  boxes, and arrange those columns from left to right to form a Young diagram containing  boxes in all. The essential ingredient of the proof is the following simple property, which uses multi-index notation for monomials in the variables .

Lemma.

Proof. The leading term of the product is the product of the leading terms of each factor (this is true whenever one uses a monomial order, like the lexicographic order used here), and the leading term of the factor  is clearly .

Now one proves by induction on the leading monomial in lexicographic order, that any nonzero homogeneous symmetric polynomial  of degree  can be written as polynomial in the elementary symmetric polynomials. Let the coefficient of this term be , then  is either zero or a symmetric polynomial with a strictly smaller leading monomial.

The fact that this expression is unique, or equivalently that all the products (monomials)  of elementary symmetric polynomials are linearly independent, is also easily proved.

See also

Symmetric polynomial
Complete homogeneous symmetric polynomial
Schur polynomial
Newton's identities
Newton's inequalities 
Maclaurin's inequality 
MacMahon Master theorem
Symmetric function
Representation theory

References
 
 

Homogeneous polynomials
Symmetric functions
Articles containing proofs